The Kakuhan Range is a mountain range in southeastern Alaska, United States, located on the east side of the Lynn Canal south of Haines and north of Berners Bay which in turn is approximately  north of Juneau.

See also
List of mountain ranges
Lions Head Mountain

References

Boundary Ranges
Mountains of Haines Borough, Alaska
Mountains of Juneau, Alaska